Laia Martínez i López (born 1984), also known as Laia MaLo, is a Catalan writer and musician.

Life
Malo was born in Berga, Catalonia, Spain in 1984.
In 2007, she graduated from the Autonomous University of Barcelona in Translation and Interpreting.

Career
Since 2012 she is part of the electronic duo Jansky, which has published, with the record label Primeros Pasitos, the albums Un big bang a la gibrella and ÈÉ in 2013 and 2015, respectively. Their latest LP, This is electroverse was published in 2018 with Hidden Track Records.
Since 2014 she has been vocal for Mallorca of the Associació d'Escriptors en Llengua Catalana (AELC).

In 2015 she finished her third work Cançó amb esgarrip i dos poemes. Her collection Afollada, published in 2016, addresses the issue of motherhood and presents itself as a song to freedom. Her latest collection is Venus volta (Lleonard Muntaner, 2018).

Awards
In 2011 she won the Art Jove poetry prize of 2010 for her book L'estiu del tonight, tonight. and which has been translated into Spanish.
In 2018 Jansky won the SUNS Award to Best European Band in a Minorized Language (Udine, Italy).

Translations
Malo has been in charge of the first Catalan translation of Patti Smith. The collection of poems Auguris d'innocència (Auguries of innocence) was published in 2019 by Labreu Edicions.

References

1984 births
Living people
Spanish women poets
21st-century Spanish poets
21st-century Spanish women writers
Poets from Catalonia
Women writers from Catalonia
People from Berguedà
Autonomous University of Barcelona alumni